Qualification for men's artistic gymnastics competitions at the 2018 Mediterranean Games was held at the Pavelló Olímpic de Reus between 23 and 24 June 2018. Qualification for the individual all-around and individual apparatus finals was achieved through the team competition for athletes that were part of a team. Individual athletes competed qualification routines at the same time as the team competition. The top 22 all-around scores progressed to the all-around final and the top 8 scores on each apparatus progressed to the relevant apparatus final. There was a limit of 2 athletes per country in each final.

Results

Individual all-around

Floor Exercise

Pommel Horse

Rings

Vault

Parallel Bars

Horizontal Bar

References

Gymnastics at the 2018 Mediterranean Games